Eupithecia hypophasma is a moth in the  family Geometridae. It is found in Lesotho and South Africa.

References

Moths described in 1913
hypophasma
Moths of Africa